Sphaeniscus quadrincisus is a species of tephritid or fruit flies in the genus Sphaeniscus of the family Tephritidae.

Distribution
India, Sri Lanka, South China, Taiwan.

References

Tephritinae
Insects described in 1824
Diptera of Asia